Algot is a masculine given name and has variants of Algott, Allgott and Algoth. It is a derivative of Old Norse word Algautr and is a compound word consisting of al "elf" or "all" and gautr "man from Götaland." 

People with the name include:

Given name
 Algot Christoffersson, Swedish football player
 Algot Haglund (1905–1963), Swedish football player
 Algot Haquinius (1886–1966), Swedish pianist and composer 
 Algot Lange (1884–?), Swedish explorer
 Algot Larsson (1889–1967), Swedish athlete 
 Algot Lönn (1887–1953), Swedish road racing cyclist 
 Algot Magnuson of Revsnes (c.1355–c.1426), Swedish magnate, and castellan of Styresholm
 Algot Malmberg (1903–1971), Swedish wrestler
 Algot Nilsson, Swedish bandy player
 Algoth Niska (1888–1954), Finnish bootlegger and adventurer
 Algot Tergel (1906–1996), Swedish priest, teacher and author
 Algot Törneman (1909–1993), Swedish enamel artist and painter
 Algot Untola (1868–1918), Finnish writer and journalist

Middle name
 Erik Algot Fredriksson (1885–1930), Swedish tug of war competitor

References

Swedish masculine given names